Ana Milena Muñoz Gómez (born January 26, 1956) is the wife of the 28th president of Colombia, César Gaviria Trujillo, and served as First Lady of Colombia from 1990 to 1994.

Personal life
Ana Milena was born on 29 January 1956 in Pereira, Risaralda to Jorge Muñoz Mejía and Lida Gómez Vernaza, the third of six children. She attended the Colegio de los Sagrados Corazones in Pereira, and is an alumna of the University of the Andes where she obtained a degree in Economics. She also holds a Master's in Latin American History from Georgetown University, and in 2010 she returned to her alma mater to study Architecture.

She married César Gaviria Trujillo on 28 June 1978 and they have two children, Simón and María Paz.

References

External links
 

1956 births
Living people
People from Pereira, Colombia
University of Los Andes (Colombia) alumni
Georgetown University alumni
Colombian economists
Colombian journalists
Colombian women journalists
First ladies of Colombia